Worcestobia is an extinct genus of scorpionfly. It is the only member of the family Worcestobiidae. It was described to contain two species originally assigned to Orthophlebia. Worcestobia gigantea was originally described by Robert John Tillyard in 1933 for NHMUK I. 11102 a hindwing found in the Rhaetian aged Lilstock Formation near Strensham, Worcestershire, United Kingdom The other species, Worcestobia haradai was described in 1991 from KMNH IP 000,002 a forewing found in the Carnian aged Momonoki Formation in a mine near Okuhata, Yamaguchi Prefecture, Japan. It is distinguished from other members of Panorpoidea by "the forking of Rs2 into two long veins Rs2a and Rs2b"

References 

Mecoptera
Prehistoric insect genera